Silverwater Bridge is a  concrete box girder bridge that spans the Parramatta River west of the central business district in Sydney, New South Wales, Australia. The bridge carries Silverwater Road (A6) over the river to link Silverwater in the south to Rydalmere and Ermington in the north.

Description 
The Silverwater Bridge opened on 10 November 1962, and was the first concrete box girder bridge built in New South Wales.

It was the first of the two major bridges needed to construct the Hornsby-Heathcote county road (the other being the Alfords Point Bridge), and was the second project undertaken in the construction of this county road (the first being Olympic Drive Lidcombe, between Boorea and Church Streets, in 1959).

In conjunction with the construction of the bridge, Silverwater Road between Parramatta Road and the bridge was widened to six lanes, and was extended across the new bridge to connect to Victoria Road at Ermington.

The origin of the suburb's name, and subsequently the bridge's name, is unknown. It may have been a reference to the nearby Parramatta River, which could have provided silver reflections of light off the water.

Other crossings over the Parramatta River include the Gladesville Bridge and Ryde Bridge.

Gallery

See also

 List of bridges in Sydney

References

1962 establishments in Australia
Box girder bridges
Bridges in Sydney
Bridges completed in 1962
Concrete bridges in Australia
Silverwater, New South Wales
Road bridges in New South Wales
Parramatta River